Isabelle Accambray (née Reynaud; born 9 July 1956) is a former French discus thrower. Born in Clichy, she was a member of Athlétic Club de Cannes during her career. She represented France 25 times in international competition, with her best result being a gold medal at the 1983 Mediterranean Games. She participated at the European Cup in 1979, 1981 and 1983, as well as at the 1982 European Athletics Championships. She was a three-time French champion in the discus.

Personal life 
Isabelle is married to Jacques Accambray, a former hammer thrower and President of the French Federation of American Football from 1985 to 1996. Their daughter, Jennifer, is also an athlete, specialising in the Javelin.  Their son William is a handball player playing with Paris Saint-Germain Handball  .  The last child, Michael, has begun a career as a volleyball player.

National titles 
French Championships in Athletics
Discus throw: 1980, 1981, 1982

National records 
French record
 53.42m the September 23, 1981 at Issy-les-Moulineaux   
   53.52mNovember 7, 1981 at Pirae   
   53.98m the May 2, 1982 at Nice   
   54.52m the May 15, 1982 at Fort-de-France   
   55.04m the June 5, 1982 at Reims   
   56.28m the August 22, 1982 at Steinkjer

References 

 
All Athletics profile

1956 births
Living people
French female discus throwers
Sportspeople from Clichy, Hauts-de-Seine
Mediterranean Games gold medalists for France
Athletes (track and field) at the 1983 Mediterranean Games
Mediterranean Games medalists in athletics
20th-century French women